Sırrı Süreyya Önder (born 7 July 1962) is a Turkish film director, actor, screenwriter, columnist and politician. Elected to parliament in 2011 as an independent backed by the Peace and Democracy Party (BDP), he later joined the party even though he is not from a Kurdish descent. He competed in the 2014 municipal elections as the Istanbul mayoral candidate of the Peoples' Democratic Party (HDP), the sister party of the BDP, coming third with 412,875 votes (4.83%). In the general election of 7 June 2015 he was elected as MP for the 1st electoral district of Ankara Province.

Early years and education
Önder was born to a Turkoman family on 7 July 1962 in Adıyaman (a city in Turkey with Kurdish majority) to a barber father, who was founder and leader of the provincial office of Behice Boran's Workers Party of Turkey (TİP) in the 1960s. His father died from cirrhosis when Önder was eight years old. His mother moved with him and his four younger siblings to the maternal grandfather's house. To support his family, whilst still at school, he began working as an apprentice in a photograph shop, and this continued until he was in the tenth grade of high school.

At the age of sixteen Önder began to earn more money working for the National Malaria Eradication Program. He got involved in the trade union movement and this led to him being fired. Following a brief time in his own tire repair shop he made a living in the countryside by taking people's photographs for their identity documents.

In 1980 Önder enrolled in the University in Ankara to study political science. During the second term he joined a political student movement to protest the military junta that had overturned the government on 12 September 1980. He was arrested and sentenced to twelve years in prison on charges of membership in an illegal organization. He was incarcerated in overcrowded wards in prisons like Mamak, Ulucanlar and Haymana.

Career
Önder's 2006 film The International was awarded the Best Picture Prize at the  2007 International Adana Golden Boll Film Festival, and was entered into the 29th Moscow International Film Festival.

In 2010 Önder began a columnist career at the newspaper BirGün. He then continued to write at the daily Radikal. Backed by the Peace and Democracy Party (BDP) in the 2011 parliamentary elections, he ran as an independent. Elected as a deputy for Istanbul, he then joined the BDP. After entering parliament, he quit his post at Radikal. He also wrote for Özgür Gündem.

Önder was involved in the 2013 Taksim Gezi Park protests and was reportedly hospitalised after being hit by a tear gas cartridge. He was part of a delegation of HDP politicians facilitating a dialogue between Öcalan and the Turkish Government which on 28 February 2015 led to the Dolmabahce Consensus. Önder was sentenced to 43 months in prison on 3 December 2018 for a speech he held during the Newroz festivities in 2013. On 6 December 2018 he went to prison in Kocaeli. On 4 October 2019, Önder was released after the Constitutional Court ruled his freedom of expression had been violated a day earlier. On 17 March 2021, the State Prosecutor to the Court of Cassation Bekir Şahin filed a lawsuit before the Constitutional Court demanding for Önder and 686 other HDP politicians a five-year ban to engage in politics together with a closure of the HDP due to their alleged organizational unity with the  Kurdistan Workers' Party (PKK).

Filmography
2006
 The International, director, screenwriter, film score and actor - Best Picture Award 2007 International Adana Golden Boll Film Festival
 Sis ve Gece, actor
Beynelmilel, director

2008
 O... Çocukları, screenwriter
 Kalpsiz Adam, advisor to screenwriter
2009
 Ada: Zombilerin Düğünü, (guest actor)
 Ejder Kapanı, actor
2010
 Mar, guest actor
2011
 Yeraltı, actor
2012
 F Tipi film, director
2013
 Düğün Dernek, actor

References

External links

1962 births
Living people
People from Adıyaman
Turkish film directors
Turkish male film actors
Turkish male screenwriters
Turkish columnists
Deputies of Istanbul
BirGün people
Radikal (newspaper) people
Turkish prisoners and detainees
Peoples' Democratic Party (Turkey) politicians
Members of the 25th Parliament of Turkey
Members of the 24th Parliament of Turkey
Members of the 26th Parliament of Turkey
Politicians arrested in Turkey